The Institute for the Promotion of Teaching Science and Technology (IPST) is a Thai state agency, founded in 1972. Its responsibilities include the development of national science and mathematics curricula, and sponsorship of science education, as well as the promotion of science in general. It is also Thailand's coordinator for the International Science Olympiad.

See also
Thailand at the International Science Olympiad

References

Public organizations of Thailand
Educational organizations based in Thailand
Science education in Thailand
Government agencies established in 1972
1972 establishments in Thailand